Jantjes is a surname. Notable people with the surname include:

Conrad Jantjes (born 1980), South African rugby union footballer 
Gavin Jantjes (born 1948), South African painter, curator, writer, and lecturer

See also
Jantje, a given name